American singer and songwriter Sky Ferreira has released one studio album, three extended plays, 10 singles (including one as a featured artist), three promotional singles (including one as a featured artist), and 15 music videos. She signed a recording contract with Parlophone in 2009, and released the song "One" through the label in 2010. It was written by Ferreira, Bloodshy & Avant, Magnus Lidehäll, and Marit Bergman, and peaked at number 64 on the UK Singles Chart. It was followed by "Obsession" later that year, which was written by Ferreira, Jerrod Bettis, Justin Franks, and Ryan Tedder. It reached number 37 on the US Billboard Hot Dance Club Songs chart. During this time, much of her lyrical content incorporated themes of rebellion and teenage romance.

Ferreira released her first extended play, As If!, in 2011, for which she co-wrote "Sex Rules" and "99 Tears" with Greg Kurstin, and "Haters Anonymous" and "108" with Bloodshy & Avant. Her second extended play, Ghost, was released in 2012 by Capitol Records; it substituted the synth-pop styles displayed in her earlier projects, and instead showcased more prominent elements of acoustic, new wave, and rock music. Its second single, "Everything Is Embarrassing", was written by Ferreira, Dev Hynes, and Ariel Rechtshaid, and had sold 19,000 copies in the United States as of March 2014.

Ferreira released her debut studio album, Night Time, My Time, in October 2013; it was largely inspired in indie rock musical styles. The record debuted at number 45 on the US Billboard 200, becoming her first entry on the chart. Ariel Rechtshaid and Justin Louis "J.L." Raisen helped to co-write each of its 12 tracks. Her third extended play, Night Time, My Time: B-Sides Part 1, was released roughly one month later, and featured additional writing contributions from Rechitshaid. That year, she additionally appeared as a featured vocalist on the track "Black" by South Korean recording artist G-Dragon for his second studio album, Coup d'Etat; he co-wrote the song with Teddy Park.

Studio albums

Extended plays

Singles

As lead artist

As featured artist

Promotional singles

Other charted songs

Guest appearances

Songwriting credits

Music videos

Guest appearances

References

External links
 
 
 
 

Discographies of American artists
Pop music discographies